The Moravian-Silesian Football League (MSFL) is one of the third level football leagues in the Czech Republic (the other is the Bohemian Football League) headquartered in Olomouc. The league comprises teams from the historic regions of Moravia and Silesia and partially also Bohemia.

The league was formed in 1991 during the Czechoslovakia era, replacing the former II.ČNL (II. Česká národni liga; Second Czech National League) at the third tier of Czechoslovak football alongside sister league ČFL. 

The winner of MSFL is promoted to the Czech National Football League. Three clubs are promoted to the MSFL - the winners of Divize D, E and F of the Czech Fourth Division.

Moravian-Silesian Football League clubs in 2022–23

Moravian-Silesian Football League champions

References 
 Information at the ČMFS website.

3
Czech
Professional sports leagues in the Czech Republic